Trichodes peninsularis is a species of checkered beetle in the family Cleridae. It is found in Central America and North America.

Subspecies
These two subspecies belong to the species Trichodes peninsularis:
 Trichodes peninsularis basalis
 Trichodes peninsularis horni

References

Further reading

 

Trichodes
Articles created by Qbugbot
Beetles described in 1894